The Council of Nobility (French: Conseil de noblesse, Dutch: Raad van Adel) offers counsel to the King of the Belgians regarding all matters pertaining to the Kingdom's nobility.

History 
It was created by Royal Decree on 27 February 1996 as a replacement of the Conseil héraldique de Belgique (Heraldry Council of Belgium) which itself was created on 6 February 1844.

Heraldic authority 
It also serves as the heraldic authority for the Belgian nobility. It does so alongside the two other heraldic authorities of Belgium: the Council of Heraldry and Vexillology for the French community and the Flemish Heraldic Council for the Flemish community.

See also 

 Belgian heraldry

References

Further reading 

 Leon ARENDT & Alphonse DE RIDDER, Législation héraldique de la Belgique 1595-1895. Jurisprudence du Conseil héraldique 1844-1895, Brussels, 1896.
 A. BRAAS, La législation nobiliaire en Belgique, Brussels, 1960
 M. VAN DAMME, De juridische grondslagen van de nobiliteitsregeling in België, in: Rechtskundig Weekblad, 1979-80, col. 1317-1326.
 Christiane HOOGSTOEL-FABRI (dir.), Le droit nobiliaire et le Conseil héraldique, Brussels, Larcier, 1994.
 Henri D'UDEKEM D'ACOZ, Le Raad van Adel - Conseil de Noblesse remplace le Conseil Héraldique, in: Bulletin trimestriel de l'Association de la Noblesse du Royaume de Belgique, n° 207, July 1996, n° 207, July 1996, p. 17-24.
 Eric CUSAS, Le statut de la noblesse en France et en Belgique, Brussels, Bruylant, 2002.
 Henri D'UDEKEM D'ACOZ, La législation nobiliaire, dans: Bulletin trimestriel de l'Association de la Noblesse du Royaume de Belgique, n° 236, October 2003, p. 21-29.

External links 
 Website

Heraldic authorities